Károly Mária Kertbeny (or Karl Maria Benkert) (28 February 1824 – 23 January 1882) was a Hungarian journalist, translator, memoirist, and human rights campaigner. He is best known for coining the words heterosexual and homosexual as the German nouns Heterosexual and Homosexual.

He translated works by Hungarian poets and writers into German such as those by Sándor Petőfi, János Arany and Mór Jókai. Among his acquaintances were Heinrich Heine, George Sand, Alfred de Musset, Hans Christian Andersen, and the Brothers Grimm.

Early life

Karl Maria Benkert was born in Vienna to Hungarian parents on 28 February 1824. He moved with his family to Budapest when he was a child and was equally fluent in German and Hungarian. After a stint in the Hungarian army, Benkert made a living as a journalist and travel writer and wrote at least twenty-five books on various subjects.

Career
Benkert left Hungary and was determined to become an advocate on behalf of Hungarian culture. He, therefore, arranged for his legal name to take the Hungarian form under which he lived and published for most of his life. Final approval on 22 February 1848 made him Kertbeny Károly Mária or, in the standard way of rendering a Hungarian name in other European languages, Károly Mária Kertbeny.

He made a variety of contacts in his travels. He was Charles Baudelaire's only personal Austro-Hungarian contact.

In his fiction, quite apart from his political advocacy, Kertbeny included homosexual characters in several works, including Errinnerungen an Charles Sealsfield, Spiegelbilder der Erinnerung and the short story "Im Walde".

Writings on sexuality
He settled in Berlin in 1868, when he was still unmarried at 44. Kerbeny claimed in his writings to be "normally sexed". However, his diaries list a self-censored string of encounters with youths and men (“young barber lad"; "very much in love with the lad"; "I have done it"), and recurring fear following the arrest of Karl Heinrich Ulrichs with whom he corresponded ("Awful days!.... Horrible nightmares. I have burnt all the dangerous letters"), which suggest he was secretly homosexual.

He explained his interest in sexual minorities as his "instinctive drive to take issue with every injustice". His cited as a formative experience from his teenage years the suicide of a co-worker who was being blackmailed and threatened with exposure as a homosexual.

In 1869, he published two anonymous pamphlets. He  argued that the Prussian sodomy law, Paragraph 143, which later became Paragraph 175 of the penal code of the German Empire, violated the "rights of man". He advanced the classic liberal argument that consensual sexual acts in private should not be subject to criminal law. He contended that the Prussian law allowed blackmailers to extort money from homosexuals and often drove them to suicide.

Whether sexual preference was innate was called by Kerbeny "a very interesting riddle of nature" that was best excluded from arguments for the decriminalization of sexual practices. Instead, he considered the right of a government to intervene in private matters. He wrote:

On the other hand, he repeatedly described one's sexual drive as "innate and unchanging". That contradicted the dominant view up to that time of men committing "sodomy" out of mere wickedness. Gay men, he said, were not by nature effeminate, and he pointed out that many of the great heroes of history were gay. With Heinrich Hössli and Karl Heinrich Ulrichs, he was among the first writers to put those now-familiar arguments before the public.

In a letter written on 6 May 1868, Kertbeny published, in German the terms homosexual and  heterosexual as part of his system for defining sexual types to replace the pejorative terms "sodomite" and "pederast", which were used in the German- and French-speaking world of his time. In addition, he called those who masturbate monosexualists and practitioners of anal intercourse pygists.

He also used German terms that did not influence his contemporaries but suggest how he was considering terms that did not rely on classical languages, including Die Gleichegeschlechtlichen ("those of the same sex") and Der Gleichegeschlechtlicher Akt ("the same-sex act").

Kertbeny made no further contribution to the debates about homosexuality or its legal status or origins. In 1880, he offered a chapter on homosexuality for Gustav Jäger to include in his book Discovery of the Soul, but Jäger's publisher decided that it was too controversial and omitted it. Jäger nevertheless used Kertbeny's terminology elsewhere in the book.

Death

Kertbeny died in Budapest on 23 January 1882 at the age of 58.  (1836–1894) eulogized him: "He devoted his life to serving his country, even when he was living abroad. He publicised our glory there amongst foreign peoples. His first literary activities were received with mockery, but he did not give up and he brought light to Hungarian literature for foreign people".

The Hungarian writer and literary historian  has described him in these terms: "This moody, fluttering, imperfect writer is one of the best and undeservedly forgotten Hungarian memoir writers". He also said: "He was born effeminately sensitive, soft, believing, fair, open minded and enthusiastic for beauty. He loved to love, and loved to be loved. He loved only the beautiful and he wanted the love of the best. Mária! - An old, vain, swindling, naughty, clownish, thick skinned, envious, literary adventurer became of him: Károly, poor, Károly!"

Kertbeny's gravesite, which was identified in 2001, is located in Budapest's Kerepesi Cemetery, which is the final resting place of numerous prominent Hungarians of the 19th and the 20th centuries. The gay community set a new tombstone on it, and since 2002, a wreath is placed at his grave as part of Hungarian gay festivals.

Notes

References

Additional sources

External links 

1824 births
1882 deaths
German opinion journalists
Hungarian non-fiction writers
Hungarian LGBT journalists
Austrian LGBT rights activists
Burials at Kerepesi Cemetery
19th-century German journalists
German male journalists
19th-century German male writers
Translators to German